Tiger Scout can refer to:

Tiger Scout (Korea Scout Association), the highest rank in Korean Scouting
Tiger Cubs, the youngest level of Cub  Scouting (Boy Scouts of America), formerly a separate membership section